The RS700 is a single-handed racing dinghy built by RS Sailing and designed in 2000 by Nick Peters and Alex Southon as part of the RS series and built in 2001. It is raced in many sailing clubs around Britain, with a PY number of 850 and a D-PN of 73.3.

Performance and design
The RS700 is regarded by many professionals, including German Contender champion Christian Brandt, as the fastest and most user friendly skiff around, the magazine Yachts & Yachting has referred to it as being "simple but highly effective", the magazine also commented on the ease with which the spinnaker can be raised and lowered. The RS700 has a trapeze, mainsail and an asymmetrical spinnaker, but no jib. The width of the wings on the RS700 are adjustable, meaning that the boat can be sailed by different sized sailors.

Nick Peters, one of the designers has commented on the RS700 saying that, like all the previous dinghies in the RS series, it has a light hull and a huge sail area, but that it is conceptually very different from the RS600. Peters has also said that the RS700 can easily keep speed with the RS800.

References

External links
 RS Sailing (Global HQ) - http://www.rssailing.com
 RS Sailing Australia - http://www.rssailing.com.au
 RS Sailing France - http://www.rssailing.fr
 RS Sailing South Africa - http://www.rssailing.co.za
 ISAF Connect to Sailing - http://www.sailing.org

Class Associations
 International RS Classes Association (IRSCA) - http://irsca.rssailing.net
 UK RS Association - http://www.rs-association.com
 Czech RS700 Class Association with more than 30 boats - http://www.rs700.cz
 Plachetnice RS700 - Asociace lodních tříd RS - moderní jachting a plachetnice RS v Čechách a na Slovensku
 Germany RS Class Association - http://www.rs-kv.de

Dinghies
2000s sailboat type designs
Boats designed by Nick Peters
Sailboat type designs by Alex Southon
Sailboat types built by RS Sailing